Göhərli (also, Gëkharli and Gyukharly) is a village and municipality in the Imishli Rayon of Azerbaijan.  It has a population of 867.

References 

Populated places in Imishli District